Gorenji Maharovec ( or) is a settlement west of Šentjernej in southeastern Slovenia. The area is part of the traditional region of Lower Carniola and is now included in the Southeast Slovenia Statistical Region.

References

External links
Gorenji Maharovec on Geopedia

Populated places in the Municipality of Šentjernej